The Misadventures of Margaret is a 1998 French-British romantic comedy film directed by Brian Skeet and starring Parker Posey, Jeremy Northam and Craig Chester. It was based on the novel Rameau's Niece by Cathleen Schine. The film is about the bored wife of a Professor who decides to write an erotic novel.

Cast
 Parker Posey as Margaret Nathan
 Jeremy Northam as Edward Nathan
 Craig Chester as Richard Lane
 Elizabeth McGovern as Till Turner
 Brooke Shields as Lily
 Corbin Bernsen as Art Turner
 Justine Waddell as Young Girl
 Patrick Bruel as Martin
 Stéphane Freiss as The Philosopher
 Amy Phillips as Sarah From Brighton
 Alexis Denisof as Dr. Lipi
 Sylvie Testud as Young Nun
 Al Mackenzie as Richard's Boyfriend
 Kerry Shale as Librarian
 Jeff Harding as Man at Party
 Jacey Sallés as Astronaught #1
 Teresa Gallagher as Astronaught #2
 Melanie Claus as Astronaught #3
 Danusio Salememoreia as French Gardner
 Charlie Waterman as Waitress / 18th Century Lesbian
 Oni Faida Lampley as Baroness
 Lawrence Davison as Young Girl's Uncle
 Chris Rice as Lily's Hunk

References

External links

1998 films
1998 romantic comedy films
Films based on American novels
British romantic comedy films
French romantic comedy films
1990s English-language films
1990s British films
1990s French films